Tepoto Atoll (Tepoto Sud), or Ti Poto, is a small atoll of the Tuamotu Archipelago in French Polynesia.

Tepoto Atoll is almost round in shape. It measures  in diameter. Its lovely turquoise-blue lagoon is connected to the ocean by a narrow channel in the north-east.

The small group formed by Tepoto Sud, Hiti and Tuanake is also known as the "Raevski Atolls". The Tuamotu reed warbler and the Polynesian ground dove are found in this area.

Tepoto Atoll is permanently uninhabited.

According to articles in Ireland's Own and the Times Educational Supplement Website, the atoll is identified by Tony Crowley as being the site of buried treasure stolen during the 19th century by four adventurers from a church in Pisco, Peru. Over the years, people have searched for the treasure without success, though an Australian visitor to the atoll discovered a cache of medallions, the contents of which indicated they came from South America.

History
Tepoto Sud was sighted by French explorer Louis-Antoine de Bougainville in 1768, but the first European to land was Russian explorer Fabian Gottlieb von Bellingshausen in 1820.

Administration
Tepoto Sud belongs to the commune of Makemo, which consists of the atolls of Makemo, Haraiki, Marutea Nord, Katiu, Tuanake, Hiti, Tepoto Sud, Raroia, Takume, Taenga and Nihiru.

References

Notes

Sources

 
Tuamotu reed-warbler
Polynesian Ground Dove
Atoll names

External links
Atoll list (in French)

Atolls of the Tuamotus